Liliana Řeháková, married name: Střechová (10 December 1958 — 10 December 2008) was a Czech ice dancer who competed for Czechoslovakia. With Stanislav Drastich, she placed fourth at the 1979 European Championships, the 1979 World Championships, and the 1980 Winter Olympics. 

Střechová died suddenly on the day of her 50th birthday. She was the daughter of Dagmar Lerchová, who competed in ladies' singles at the 1948 Winter Olympics.

Competitive highlights

Ice dance with Drastich

Ladies' singles

References 

1958 births
2008 deaths
Czechoslovak female ice dancers
Czech female ice dancers
Figure skaters from Prague
Olympic figure skaters of Czechoslovakia
Figure skaters at the 1980 Winter Olympics